Kienberg (Gärten der Welt) is a station on the U-Bahn in the German capital city of Berlin. It is located on the  line.

Location

The underground station is located in the section east of the Hellersdorfer Straße. It has a central platform, which is continuously covered by a one-piece reinforced concrete structure. The color of the station, which can be found on the roof supports and in the entrance area, is gray. There are outputs at both ends; in the south via a pedestrian bridge to Hellersdorfer Straße and Erich-Kästner-Straße and in the north to Neue Grottkauer Straße. The latter also has a ramp for barrier-free access, which was supplemented by a lift in the course of the construction work on the occasion of the International Garden Exhibition 2017 in December 2016.

History

The station opened in July 1989, just a few months before the fall of the Berlin Wall. The eastern extension of (what is now) line U5 was one of the last major construction projects of the former German Democratic Republic.

The planned name of the station was Kaulsdorf-Nordost. However, when it opened the station's name was Heinz-Hoffmann-Straße (named after Heinz Hoffmann, general of the GDR army). In 1991 it got the name Grottkauer Straße, then in 1996 it got the new name Neue Grottkauer Straße. In 2016, the station was renamed again into Kienberg (Gärten der Welt) due to the international horticultural exhibition Internationale Gartenausstellung 2017 (IGA 2017).

Services
The station is the eastern terminus of the IGA Cable Car, an aerial tramway serving the Erholungspark Marzahn, built for the IGA 2017.

References

External links

U5 (Berlin U-Bahn) stations
Buildings and structures in Marzahn-Hellersdorf
Railway stations in Germany opened in 1989
1989 establishments in East Germany